Charles Ewing Armstrong (October 23, 1881 – March 12, 1952) was an American rower who competed in the 1904 Summer Olympics.

He was born in Philadelphia. In 1904, he was part of the American boat that won the gold medal in the men's eight.

References

External links
 
 
 

1881 births
1952 deaths
Rowers from Philadelphia
Rowers at the 1904 Summer Olympics
Olympic gold medalists for the United States in rowing
American male rowers
Medalists at the 1904 Summer Olympics